The 1986 Santa Clara Broncos football team represented Santa Clara University as a member of the Western Football Conference (WFC) during the 1986 NCAA Division II football season. The Broncos were led by second-year head coach Terry Malley. They played home games at Buck Shaw Stadium in Santa Clara, California. Santa Clara finished the season with a record of four wins and seven losses (4–7, 2–4 WFC). The Broncos were outscored by their opponents 230–334 for the season.

Schedule

Team players in the NFL
No Santa Clara Broncos players were selected in the 1987 NFL Draft.

The following finished their college career in 1986, were not drafted, but played in the NFL.

References

Santa Clara
Santa Clara Broncos football seasons
Santa Clara Broncos football